The Prefecture of the Papal Household is the office in charge of the Papal Household, a section of the Roman Curia that comprises the Papal Chapel (Cappella Pontificia) and the Papal Family (Familia Pontificia).

The current Prefect of the household is Archbishop Georg Gänswein, appointed on 7 December 2012.

Functions
As the apostolic constitution Pastor Bonus states, "The Prefecture of the Papal Household looks after the internal organization of the papal household, and supervises everything concerning the conduct and service of all clerics and laypersons who make up the papal chapel and family. It is at the service of the Supreme Pontiff, both in the Apostolic Palace and when he travels in Rome or in Italy."

The Prefecture runs the Apostolic Palace, containing the Papal Apartments, and the Papal Palace and Villa Barberini in the town of Castel Gandolfo.

The Prefecture has competence for matters that once belonged to several offices, now suppressed: the Ceremonial Congregation, the offices of the Majordomo, the Master of the Chamber, and the Master of the Sacred Apostolic Palaces, and the Heraldic Commission for the Papal Court.

Papal Chapel and Papal Family

The Papal Chapel has a membership that includes the Cardinals, the Patriarchs, the Archbishops who head departments of the Roman Curia, and the secretaries of the Congregations.

The Papal Family has lay members as well as clergy. Among the ecclesiastics who have membership are other high officials of the Roman Curia, but also all apostolic protonotaries, Honorary Prelates and Chaplains of His Holiness, while the lay members include all Gentlemen of His Holiness, the Commandant of the Papal Swiss Guard and the Counsellors of the State of Vatican City.

The Papal Family includes among its members the Theologian of the Pontifical Household, since 2005 Father Wojciech Giertych, and the Preacher to the Papal Household, since 1980 Raniero Cantalamessa, who was made a cardinal in 2020.

The Papal Family also includes those who look after the Pope's daily household affairs, such as those who actually keep house and cook for him, including those who may act as his butler.

List of Prefects of the Papal Household

Rafael Merry del Val (1903-1914)
Pietro Gasparri (1914-1918)
Giovanni Tacci Porcelli (1918-1921)
Mario Nasalli Rocca di Corneliano (1968–1969)
Jacques-Paul Martin (1969–1986)
Dino Monduzzi (1986–1998)
James Harvey (1998–2012)
 Stanisław Dziwisz (Adjunct Prefect, 1998–2005)
Georg Gänswein (from 2012)

See also

 Hereditary officers of the Roman Curia
 Index of Vatican City-related articles

Notes

External links
Prefecture of the Papal Household
Reorganization of the Papal Household in 1968
GCatholic.org

Departments of the Roman Curia